is a Japanese footballer currently playing as a midfielder for Tegevajaro Miyazaki.

Career statistics

Club
.

Notes

References

1996 births
Living people
Sportspeople from Chiba Prefecture
Association football people from Chiba Prefecture
Nippon Sport Science University alumni
Japanese footballers
Association football midfielders
Japan Football League players
J3 League players
FC Tokyo players
Tegevajaro Miyazaki players